University Institute of Technology, The University of Burdwan  is a "NAAC A accredited" Tier-II (under TEQIP) University. Department of Engineering & Technology, constituent to The University of Burdwan , located in Burdwan, West Bengal. It is the only Government Engineering Public University located in Burdwan District.

History 

It was established in the year 1999 as a department of The University of Burdwan which represented the former engineering faculty of Regional Engineering College (R.E.C.), Durgapur (now, N.I.T. Durgapur).

The institute has the status of a professional college run and managed by the university. Sri Buddhadeb Bhattacharyya, Chief Minister, Government of West Bengal, inaugurated the UIT building on 4 September 2001. With the approval of Government of West Bengal and All India Council for Technical Education (AICTE), three graduate engineering courses, viz., Computer Science & Engineering, Electronics & Communication Engineering and Information Technology were introduced from the 2000 session. From 2003 Applied Electronics and Instrumentation Engineering started. Electrical Engineering and Civil Engineering were introduced in 2008.

Campus 
The institute is located about 100 km northwest of Kolkata, on the southern side of Grand Trunk Road. The nearest airport is at Kolkata about one and a half hours' drive through NH2. Burdwan is well connected through rail and road with the rest of India.

University Institute of Technology, The University of Burdwan has a lush green campus and is a  part of University of Burdwan's campus. The Campus spans over 400 acres. The hostels are:
Banabas Boys' hostel (for first-year UG students)
S.N. Bose Boys' hostel
J.C. Bose Boys' hostel
Madame Curie Girls' hostel

Academics

Academic programmes 
University Institute of Technology, The University of Burdwan (UIT-BU) offers graduate degree courses (Bachelor of Engineering-B.Eng.) for six engineering branches:
  Electronics and Instrumentation Engineering
  Computer Science Engineering
  Electronics and  Communication Engineering
  Information Technology
  Civil Engineering
  Electrical Engineering.

It offers postgraduate courses (Master of Engineering - M. Eng.)in two branches of engineering:
 Electronics and Instrumentation Engineering
 Computer Science Engineering

Admission
UIT is approved by the Government of West Bengal and the All India Council for Technical Education. Annual intake is 360 students through WBJEE for B.Eng. and GATE score is considered for admission into its M.Eng. course.

Centre of Excellence
Institute-industry partnership cell (IIPC):
The university has opened an IIPC with financial assistance from AICTE. A university MBA Professor looks after the activity of the cell. It is looked after by a committee composed of Placement Officer, Faculty Members and representatives of the Final Year students.

Institute of Electronics and Telecommunication Engineers (IETE):
The Professional Activity Center of the IETE, a body of the Government of India for Information Technology, Computer Science & Engineering and Electronics and Communication Engineering was opened in 2002. It was upgraded to the standard of Subcenter in 2004. The purpose of this center is to inject professionalism into the outlook of the students through seminars, invited lectures and workshops.

Library
Central library
The Central library has 50,000 volumes of books with 5000 titles. 50 international journals, 20 national journals, and 10 magazines are subscribed.

UIT library
The institute library has 30,000 volumes of textbooks with 4,000 titles. The library is computerised. The library receives 20 national and 30 international journals. The library has a reading room. The library subscribes to on-line, digital libraries of academic societies like IEEE, IEE, and ACM.

Student life

Cultural and technical fests
UIT-BU conducts its cultural fest "WALTZ"  and its technical fest "UTKRISHT" every year.

Extracurricular activities
Institute has its NSS unit and REC Club (Renewable Energy Club) through which students do many extracurricular activities. The college has E-Cell, whose student panel is elected members from amongst students. Every 3 years there will be a departmental journal.

Training and placement
The Placement Cell comprises the Training & Placement Officer, college authorities, the faculty members and the students. The cell has enlisted itself with non-profit making bodies for information regarding campus recruitments and further studies.

Notable alumni 
Amalendu Chandra, Chemist, Shanti Swarup Bhatnagar laureate
Akhil Ranjan Chakravarty, Chemist, Shanti Swarup Bhatnagar laureate
Asish Banerjee, Deputy speaker of the West Bengal Legislative Assembly

References

External links 

 University of Burdwan official website
 University Institute of Technology (UIT) official website
 http://www.buruniv.ac.in/Notices/UBUR_2012190_NOT_WEBPAGE.pdf

Engineering colleges in West Bengal
Universities and colleges in Purba Bardhaman district
Educational institutions established in 1999
1999 establishments in West Bengal